South Bend Remedy Company Building is a historic building located at South Bend, St. Joseph County, Indiana. It was built in 1895, and is a two-story, transitional Queen Anne / Classical Revival style brick and limestone building. It features a recessed entrance, round turret topped by a conical roof, and a wide frieze band of garlands and torches.  It was built to house the offices and laboratory for the South Bend Remedy Company, a mail order patent medicine business. It was moved to 501 W. Colfax Ave. in 1988, and then to 402 W. Washington St. in 2003.

It was listed on the National Register of Historic Places in 1985 and again in 2001.  It is located in the West Washington Historic District.

References

Commercial buildings on the National Register of Historic Places in Indiana
Queen Anne architecture in Indiana
Neoclassical architecture in Indiana
Commercial buildings completed in 1895
Buildings and structures in South Bend, Indiana
Houses in St. Joseph County, Indiana
National Register of Historic Places in St. Joseph County, Indiana
Historic district contributing properties in Indiana
1895 establishments in Indiana